David Pech (born 22 February 2002) is a Czech footballer who currently plays as a midfielder for Slavia Prague.

Career statistics

Club

Notes

References

2002 births
Living people
Czech footballers
Czech Republic youth international footballers
Association football midfielders
FK Mladá Boleslav players
Czech First League players
People from Brandýs nad Labem-Stará Boleslav
Sportspeople from the Central Bohemian Region
SK Slavia Prague players